Şahvəlilər (also, Şahvəllər) is a village and municipality in the Barda Rayon of Azerbaijan. It has a population of 1,020.

References

Populated places in Barda District